SRAS Appala Naidu, (6 November 1925 – 1996) was an Indian Member of Parliament sitting in the Lok Sabha.

He was born in 1925 in Pendurthi, Visakhapatnam. He served as Gram Munisibhu four times between 1944 and 1964 and served as then Gram Sarpanch between 1964 and 1967.

He was Member of Andhra Pradesh Legislative Assembly between 1967 and 1969. He was elected from Parwada constituency as Indian National Congress candidate. He was Minister for Fisheries and Ports during 1969 - 71

He was elected to the 5th Lok Sabha (1971–77), 6th Lok Sabha (1977–80) and 7th Lok Sabha (1980–84) from Anakapalli (Lok Sabha constituency) as a candidate of Indian National Congress. He was also the chairman of Visakhapatnam Urban Development Authority (VUDA) in 1982–83.

Memorial
A bronze statue was erected in his memory at the Pendurthi cross roads Visakhapatnam in the mid 1990s.
A bronze statue was erected in his memory at the Kasimkota ECB Visakhapatnam in 2016.

References

India MPs 1971–1977
India MPs 1977–1979
India MPs 1980–1984
1925 births
Telugu people
Lok Sabha members from Andhra Pradesh
People from Visakhapatnam district
1996 deaths
Andhra Pradesh MLAs 1967–1972
Indian National Congress politicians from Andhra Pradesh